The Ukrainian Catholic National Shrine of the Holy Family is a Catholic church located near University Heights, Washington, D. C. The shrine is part of the Ukrainian Greek Catholic Church, a sui iuris Eastern Catholic church in communion with the Bishop of Rome. The shrine is administered by the Archeparchy of Philadelphia.

The Ukrainian Catholic National Shrine of the Holy Family is located immediately west of the Catholic University of America campus and roughly 250 feet north of the Saint John Paul II National Shrine. The Basilica of the National Shrine of the Immaculate Conception is located roughly a half a mile south along the east side of Harewood Road.

History
Eparch Constantine Bohachevsky, the first Ukrainian metropolitan bishop in the United States, created Holy Family Parish in 1949 to serve the Ukrainian Greek Catholic population in Washington, D.C., as the nearest Ukrainian parishes to the Washington area until then had been outside of the District of Columbia. Fr. Vladimir Wozniak was the parish's first pastor. The parish would relocate four times until acquiring its current site 1975. In 1976, Bishop Basil H. Losten authorized the construction of the shrine, naming it "The Ukrainian Catholic National Shrine of the Holy Family."

The cornerstone of the Lower Church was blessed by Pope John Paul II in 1979, and the Great Upper Church of the National Shrine was completed in 1999.

See also

List of the Catholic cathedrals of the United States
List of the Catholic dioceses of the United States
List of bishops
List of District of Columbia-related topics

References

External links
Ukrainian Catholic National Shrine of the Holy Family official website
History of the Metropolia (Ukrainian Catholic Archeparchy of Philadelphia official website)
Ukrainian Catholic Cathedral of the Immaculate Conception

Brookland (Washington, D.C.)
Eastern Catholic churches in Washington, D.C.
Roman Catholic national shrines in the United States
National Shrine
Ukrainian-American culture in Washington, D.C.
Ukrainian Catholic churches in the United States
Roman Catholic churches completed in 1999
Eastern Catholic shrines
1949 establishments in Washington, D.C.